Chlorolepiota is a genus of fungi in the family Agaricaceae. It is characterized by mushrooms with a macrolepiotoid habit, a pruinose yellow-greenish spore print, and the lack of clamp connections in the hyphae. The genus was circumscribed in 1979, with C. mahabaleshwarensis as the type and only species.  C. indica was described in 2013, and C. brunneotincta in 2014. All species are found in India. The generic name Chlorolepiota is a portmanteau of Chlorophyllum and Macrolepiota, two closely related genera.

See also
List of Agaricales genera
List of Agaricaceae genera

References

Agaricaceae
Agaricales genera